Balderstone is a  village and civil parish in the Ribble Valley district of Lancashire, England. The population of the Civil Parish taken at the 2011 census was 410.

Geography
It is located north-east of Preston and north-west of Blackburn.

Community
In the village are the Anglican Church of St Leonard, a primary school, and a community centre. According to the 2001 census it had a population of 379. The parish is the officially recognised address of Samlesbury Aerodrome.

See also

Listed buildings in Balderstone, Lancashire

Notes

External links

Villages in Lancashire
Civil parishes in Lancashire
Geography of Ribble Valley